The 54th Arizona State Legislature, consisting of the Arizona State Senate and the Arizona House of Representatives, was constituted in Phoenix from January 1, 2019 to December 31, 2020, during the first two years of Doug Ducey's second full term in office. Both the Senate and the House membership remained constant at 30 and 60, respectively. Following the November 2018 election, Senate balance was unchanged, leaving the Republicans with a 17–13 majority. Republicans also maintained an 31–29 majority in the House after losing four seats to the Democrats.

Sessions
The Legislature met for two regular sessions at the State Capitol in Phoenix. The first opened on January 14, 2019, and adjourned on May 28, while the Second Regular Session convened on January 13, 2020 and adjourned sine die on May 26.

There were no Special Sessions.

State Senate

Members

The asterisk (*) denotes members of the previous Legislature who continued in office as members of this Legislature.

House of Representatives

Members 
The asterisk (*) denotes members of the previous Legislature who continued in office as members of this Legislature.

References

Arizona legislative sessions
2019 in Arizona
2020 in Arizona
2019 U.S. legislative sessions
2020 U.S. legislative sessions